Agyneta bucklei is a species of sheet weaver spider found in the United States and Canada. It was described by Dupérré in 2013.

References 

bucklei
Spiders described in 2013
Spiders of North America
Fauna of the United States
Fauna of Canada
Fauna without expected TNC conservation status